Alice Walker (8 December 1900 – 14 October 1982) was a British scholar of the Elizabethan and Jacobean writer Thomas Lodge and the poet and playwright William Shakespeare.

Life 
Walker was born in 1900 in Crumpsall in Manchester. Her parents were George Edward and Mary Alice Walker. She went to school at Blackburn High School for Girls. She did well at Royal Holloway College graduating in 1923 and three years later she gained her doctorate for her thesis on the  Elizabethan and Jacobean writer Thomas Lodge. She decided that she should write a four volume description of Lodge's works and obtained a Jex-Blake scholarship.

She travelled for a year before beginning three years of lecturing at the Royal Holloway from 1928 to 1931 and then she does not appear to have taken paid work until she became a librarian in 1939. In 1933 she published The Life of Thomas Lodge again about this physician and writer of the sixteenth century.

She became an expert on the works of William Shakespeare publishing editions of his work. She was known for saying that there would never be a definitive version of his work unless a law was passed to decide it.

Walker died at Plymouth Hospital in 1982.

Works 
 Life of Thomas Lodge, 1933
 The Arte of English Poesie, with Gladys Doidge Willcock, 1934
 Edward Capell and his edition of Shakespeare, 1960
 Othello
 Textual problems of the First Folio Richard III, King Lear, Troilus & Cressida, 2 Henry IV, Hamlet, Othello
 Troilus and Cressida
 The Two Gentlemen of Verona: a concordance to the text of the first folio works

References

1900 births
1982 deaths
People from Crumpsall
English librarians
British women librarians
Alumni of Royal Holloway, University of London
20th-century English women writers
20th-century English writers
20th-century British historians
English women non-fiction writers
English literary historians
Women literary historians
British women historians